Enrico Ceccato (born 24 July 1986) is an Italian rugby union player who plays as a hooker .  As of June 2013 he played for Benetton Treviso in the Pro12.

In each of the three seasons to June 2013 Ceccato played for both Treviso and Mogliano, by loaning to the other team for a period of time.

At the international level he competed in the youth world championship in 2005 in South Africa.

Honours

 National Championship of Excellence
 Champions Benetton Treviso: 2006–07, 2008–09, 2009–10
 Champions Mogliano: 2012–13
 Coppa Italia
 Champions Benetton Treviso: 2009–10
Italian Super Cup
 Champions Benetton Treviso: 2006, 2009

References

External links
 http://www.itsrugby.co.uk/player-5429.html
 http://www.espn.co.uk/scrum/rugby/player/83442.html
 http://www.skysports.com/rugbyunion/player/0,20330,19082_332051,00.html

1986 births
Living people
Italian rugby union players
Benetton Rugby players
Mogliano Rugby players
Sportspeople from Treviso
Rugby union hookers
Rugby union centres